The Village Green is a Portland, Oregon indie rock band, composed of lead vocalist/guitarist/composer J. Nicholas Allard and drummer/producer/back-up vocalist Jeremy Sherrer, bassist/back-up vocalist Dave Depper, and lead guitarist/back-up vocalist Nathan Junior. The band reformed in 2012.

Discography 
The Village Green (2005) Hidden Peak Records
Feeling the Fall (2006) spinART Records
When the Creepers Creep In (EP/ Single) (2006)
Live on KEXP.org EP (2006)
"TVG (Untitled)" (2012)

References

External links 
 The Village Green on MySpace

Rock music duos
Musical groups from Portland, Oregon
Alternative rock groups from Oregon
Indie rock musical groups from Oregon
2004 establishments in Oregon
2012 disestablishments in Oregon
Musical groups established in 2004
Musical groups disestablished in 2012